Hynman is a given name. Notable persons with that name include:

Edmund Henry Hynman Allenby, 1st Viscount Allenby (1861–1936), British soldier and administrator 
Michael Jaffray Hynman Allenby, 3rd Viscount Allenby (1931–2014), British politician and hereditary peer

See also

Hahnemann
Hanneman
Hanoman
Hanuman (disambiguation)
Honeyman (disambiguation)
Heineman
Heinemann (disambiguation)
Heinman (disambiguation)
Heinmann (disambiguation)
Henman
Hennenman
Heynemann
Honyman
Hyneman